A parian doll, sometimes mistakenly referred to as a Dresden doll, was a type of doll manufactured primarily in Germany, from around 1860 to 1880. A parian doll, like a china doll, has a body made from fabrics and a head created from untinted white porcelain. Unlike the china doll however, the parian doll's head is not dipped in glaze before firing and as such has a matte finish, similar to bisque dolls, giving it a markedly different appearance. The term parian refers to the appearance of the fine white Parian marble of Paros, Greece. The UFDC (United Federation of Doll Clubs) accepted definition of these dolls is as follows: "Parian doll: doll made of fine white bisque (unglazed porcelain) without tinting. The features, hair and cheeks may be painted." Many collectors now are discarding the term parian in favor of untinted bisque versus tinted bisque.

Parian dolls usually have molded blond hair. Brown and black haired parians are less common. Parians are often elaborately decorated with colored feathers, flowers, scarves, ribbons, combs, jewels, and luster ruffs (single, double, occasionally triple) about the bottom of the yoke. The hair was arranged in interesting and elaborate ways. The eyes were painted or glass. The glass-eyed dolls are sought after by collectors.

The lead company in manufacturing these untinted bisque parian dolls was Alt Beck & Gottschalck. Other manufacturers include Conta & Boehme, Dornheim Koch & Fischer, Kister, Hertel Schwab & Co., C. F. Kling & Co., Simon & Halbig, Bahr & Proschild, and Hertwig among many others.

References 

Dolls